Kimberly Belton (born April 12, 1958) is an American sports producer and former basketball player. He starred while playing collegiately for the Stanford Cardinal, where he led the team in scoring for two seasons and was a three-time All-Pac-12 selection. Belton set program scoring records in total points and rebounds. He was inducted to the Stanford Athletics Hall of Fame in 1999 and the Pac-12 Conference Hall of Honor in 2016.

Belton was selected by the Phoenix Suns as the 42nd overall pick in the 1980 NBA draft and played preseason, but a knee complication ended his NBA chance. He began his broadcasting career in 1981 as a production assistant with ABC Sports, where he would become an associate director two years later. In 1985, Belton joined Turner Sports and worked as the coordinating producer for National Basketball Association (NBA) games. By 2003, Belton was working as a freelancer and producing college football and college basketball games for ESPN and ABC.

Career statistics

College

|-
| style="text-align:left;"| 1976–77
| style="text-align:left;"| Stanford
| 27 || 26 || 32.5 || .544 || – || .570 || 8.4 || 1.9 || .7 || 1.0 || 12.5
|-
| style="text-align:left;"| 1977–78
| style="text-align:left;"| Stanford
| 27 || 25 || 29.4 || .543 || – || .590 || 9.0 || 1.7 || .7 || .7 || 15.0
|-
| style="text-align:left;"| 1978–79
| style="text-align:left;"| Stanford
| 27 || 27 || 33.6 || .619 || – || .426 || 8.7 || 2.6 || .7 || .6 || 14.3
|-
| style="text-align:left;"| 1979–80
| style="text-align:left;"| Stanford
| 26 || 26 || 35.8 || .584 || – || .678 || 9.8 || 1.9 || 1.1 || .9 || 18.7
|- class="sortbottom"
| style="text-align:center;" colspan="2"| Career
| 107 || 104 || 32.8 || .572 || – || .580 || 9.0 || 2.0 || .8 || .8 || 15.1

References

External links
College statistics

1958 births
Living people
African-American basketball players
American men's basketball players
Basketball players from New York City
Horace Mann School alumni
Phoenix Suns draft picks
Small forwards
Sportspeople from the Bronx
Stanford Cardinal men's basketball players
21st-century African-American people
20th-century African-American sportspeople